In the 1961–62 American Soccer League II, Ukrainian Nationals won the championship. After the season, Galicia-Honduras withdrew.

League standings

References

American Soccer League (1933–1983) seasons
American Soccer League, 1961-62